The 1959 season was the Chicago Bears' 40th in the National Football League.  The team matched on their 8–4 record from 1958 under the coaching of George Halas, winning their last seven games.

Schedule

 Saturday night (October 3)

Game summaries

Week 1

Week 2

Week 7

Standings

References

Chicago Bears
Chicago Bears seasons
Chicago Bears